The 1983 Junior Pot Black was the third staging of the junior snooker tournament and last of the original run which was held in the Pebble Mill Studios in Birmingham. 8 young players were competing in a knockout format. The matches are one-frame shoot-outs and a 2 frame aggregate score in the final.

Broadcasts were twice weekly on BBC2 except the final which was on three times and the series started at 18:30 on Tuesday 5 July 1983. Alan Weeks presented the programme with Ted Lowe as commentator and with John Williams unavailable, Vic Bartlam took the role as referee.

The only players from the last series competing this year were defending champion John Parrott, the runner-up John Keers and semi-finalist Steve Ventham. Among the new players for this series was 14 year old Stephen Hendry who was making his television debut. He beat Nicolas Pearce in the first match before losing to Ventham in the semi-final who then lost to Parrott in the final giving the Liverpudlian his second title.

Main draw

References

Pot Black
Snooker competitions in England
1983 in snooker
1983 in English sport